The Marussia B-Series was a series of sports cars built by Russian automaker Marussia Motors (pronounced ma-rus-ya). The series consists of the B1 and the B2; the cars are technically similar but are very different in design. The two vehicles had the same engines, layout, features, suspension, and brakes. Priced at over 4,000,000 ruble (from 120,000 € to 185,000 €), they were the first Russian sports cars ever built. It featured a full carbon fiber car with aluminium chassis. About 3500 units were planned to be built.

B1

The B1 was the first car of the series and the first car produced by Marussia Motors. The chassis was built on an aluminum semi-monocoque design, and the engines were produced by a British engineering company Cosworth. Marussia plan to only produce 2999 B1s.

B2

The B2 is the B1's successor, first shown to the public at the 2009 Frankfurt Motor Show. The differences between the B1 and the B2 are only cosmetic; the B2 offers a new, edgier design and a new, almost space-age interior. The plan was meant to give the car a more aggressive look. Some design features include highlighting the grille and intakes in black to contrast them to the car's body colour and emphasize some of the car's geometric elements, as well as styling the car's face to the shape of the "M" in the Marussia Motors logo. It used primarily parts from the cheapest European cars that are small and ultra-small, except the engine from Opel.

The B2 was featured in Need for Speed: Most Wanted in 2012, Need for Speed Rivals and Asphalt 8: Airborne in 2013. In 2014 the car was also featured in Driveclub as a playable vehicle and in the official cover art for the PlayStation 4 exclusive.

In March 2012, a Finnish contract manufacturer of specialty automobiles, Valmet Automotive, and Marussia Motors entered into an agreement on the production of Marussia B2 sports cars at the Valmet car factory in Uusikaupunki, Finland. 500 units were built and until 2012 all has been "ordered" according to the company information, but 12 to 14 units were sold before the company bankruptcy in 2014.

References

External links
 

Marussia Motors
Sports cars
Rear mid-engine, rear-wheel-drive vehicles